The third Howard ministry (Liberal–National coalition) was the 62nd ministry of the Government of Australia. It was led by the country's 25th prime minister, John Howard. The third Howard ministry succeeded the second Howard ministry, which dissolved on 26 November 2001 following the federal election that took place on 10 November. The ministry was replaced by the fourth Howard ministry on 26 October 2004 following the 2004 federal election.

As of 2021, this is the earliest ministry in which all of its members are still alive.

Cabinet

Outer ministry

Parliamentary Secretaries

See also
 First Howard ministry
 Second Howard ministry
 Fourth Howard ministry

Notes

Ministries of Elizabeth II
Howard, 3
2000s in Australia
2001 establishments in Australia
2004 disestablishments in Australia
Cabinets established in 2001
Cabinets disestablished in 2004
Howard Government